The K League Federation launched other league cups in addition to the Adidas Cup from 1997 to 2000.

Finals

Awards

Top goalscorer

Source:

Top assist provider

Source:

See also
 Korean League Cup
 Adidas Cup
 Samsung Hauzen Cup

References

External links
Official website

Korean League Cup